Sphacelariales is an order of brown algae (class Phaeophyceae).

References

Further reading 
 

Brown algae orders
Brown algae